Henry Seriake Dickson (born 28 January 1966) is a Nigerian politician and a Lawyer. He is the Senator representing Bayelsa - West in the 9th National Assembly. He was the Governor of Bayelsa State in southern Nigeria from 14 February 2012 to 14 February 2020. He was a member of the House of Representatives from 2007 until 2012.

Early life and education
Henry Seriake Dickson was born 28 January 1966 in Toru-Orua Town of Sagbama Local Government Area of Bayelsa State, Nigeria. He is a descendant of the King Kpadia Royal House of Tarakiri Kingdom.

Dickson attended Kolobiriowei Primary School, Toru-Orua, from 1972 to 1978, where he obtained his First School Leaving Certificate and proceeded to Government Secondary School, Toru-Ebeni, in 1978 to 1983 where he got his West African School Certificate (WASSCE/GCE).

Dickson enrolled in the Rivers State University of Science and Technology, Port Harcourt, to study law in 1988. He earned his LL.B in 1992. In 1993, he went on to earn his Bachelors in Law from the Nigerian Law School, and was also called to the Nigerian Bar shortly thereafter.

Legal career 
Henry Seriake Dickson joined the Nigeria Police Force in 1986. Upon his graduation from the law school in 1993, he was appointed a cadet assistant superintendent of police in 1994, from where he proceeded to Nigeria Police Academy, Kano for Officer's Training. It was in the course of his training that he voluntarily resigned from the police force after nearly a decade of policing, to practice law.

As a lawyer, he worked with Serena David Dokubo & CO as an associate solicitor from 1994 to 1995 and moved to Aluko & Oyebode, a prominent law firm in Lagos, also as an associate solicitor, between 1995 and 1996. He founded Seriake Dickson & CO in Port Harcourt and later Yenagoa and became its managing solicitor from 1996 to 2006. He was elected pioneer publicity secretary, Nigerian Bar Association (NBA) Yenagoa from 1996 to 1998.

Political career

Alliance for Democracy 
Dickson began his political career as a member of Alliance for Democracy (Nigeria) and was elected as the Bayelsa State chapter chairman of the party from 1998 to 2000. The political party produced a senator representing Bayelsa West, a member of the House of Representatives representing Sagbama - Ekeremor Federal Constituency and three members of the State House of Assembly from Brass Local Government.  After his tenure as chairman elapsed, was elected national legal adviser of the Alliance for Democracy and served in that position between 2000 and 2002.

Attorney General of Bayelsa State (2006 - 2007) 
In January 2006, Dickson was appointed the attorney-general and commissioner for justice of Bayelsa State (2006 to 2007) by the then Governor, Dr. Goodluck Ebele Jonathan GCFR.

As attorney general, he was a member of the Body of Benchers, member, Council of Legal Education and vice chairman of the State Advisory Judicial Service Commission.

House of Representatives
Dickson was elected to the National Assembly's House of Representatives in 2007 and was appointed chairman, House Committee on Justice and member of several committees including Defence, National Security, Intelligence and Foreign Affairs

In April 2011, he was elected for a second term; this election was the first time that someone in his constituency has done this. In his second term, he was appointed Chairman House Committee on Special Duties.

At the National Assembly, he sponsored/co- sponsored several bills, which include:

 The Economic and Financial Crimes Commission (Establishment) Act (Amendment) Bill, 2009.
 The Corrupt Practices and Other Related Offences (Establishment) Act (Amendment) Bill, 2009.
 The Political Parties(Internal Democracy)Bill, 2008.
 The Constitution Alteration Bill, 2010.
 The Legislative Houses, Powers and Privileges Act (Amendment) Bill, 2009.
 The Evidence Bill, 2009.
 The Kidnapping and Hostage Taking (Prohibition) Bill, 2009.
 The Freedom of Information Bill, 2007.
 The Court Ordered Elections (Streamlining of Tenure of Office) Bill, 2008.
 The Prevention of Terrorism Bill, 2009.
 Transmission of power by a President or Governor amendment Bill (section 145), 2010

On December 5, 2020, Governor Dickson won the Bayelsa West Senatorial Bye-Election with over 80% of the total votes and was sworn in as Senator into the 9th Senate replacing Senator Ewhrudjakpo Lawrence on the 15th of December, 2020.

Gubernatorial career
The Independent National Electoral Commission reported that Henry Seriake Dickson won over 90% of the votes. They went on to say that this helped in "further strengthening the PDP's stronghold on power there since Jonathan became president."

Shortly after taking over gubernatorial duties, Dickson said that he was "painfully transiting to the executive arm of government." He indicated that he may return to the National Assembly someday.

Dickson was re-elected Governor of Bayelsa State at the 2015 Bayelsa State gubernatorial election. On the 14th of February, 2020, Dickson officially handed over to Douye Diri as the Governor of Bayelsa State.

See also
List of Governors of Bayelsa State

References

External links
Official Website
Twitter 
Facebook
Instagram

1966 births
Living people
Governors of Bayelsa State
Peoples Democratic Party state governors of Nigeria
Members of the House of Representatives (Nigeria)
Rivers State University alumni